Todd Woodbridge and Mark Woodforde defeated Sébastien Lareau and Alex O'Brien in the final, 4–6, 7–5, 7–5, 6–3 to win the men's doubles tennis title at the 1997 Australian Open. It was the Woodies' second and last Australian Open title.

Stefan Edberg and Petr Korda were the reigning champions, but Edberg did not compete that year. Korda partnered Pat Cash, but lost in the second round to Neil Broad and Piet Norval.

Seeds
Champion seeds are indicated in bold text while text in italics indicates the round in which those seeds were eliminated.

Draw

Finals

Top half

Section 1

Section 2

Bottom half

Section 3

Section 4

References

External links
 1997 Australian Open – Men's draws and results at the International Tennis Federation

Men's Doubles
Australian Open (tennis) by year – Men's doubles